Chechens in Syria are ethnic Chechens who form a small minority in Syria.

History 
Syria is home to a substantial Chechen population who emigrated there due to the Chechen–Russian conflict. The initial Chechen migrants sometimes clashed with local Arab and Druze settlers, though they later peacefully integrated into Syrian society. After the Syrian Civil War's outbreak in 2011, however, about 3,000 Chechen militants also travelled to Syria in order to wage jihad there, and formed numerous anti-government militias. The most notable Chechen-led groups in Syria were Jaish al-Muhajireen wal-Ansar, the Caucasus Emirate (Syrian branch), Junud al-Sham and Ajnad al-Kavkaz.

The hostility of Chechens to the Assad Government is strengthened by the close relationship between Russia and the Assad Government, and long historical Chechen–Russian conflict. There are also recent Chechen soldiers working on the Assad side, mostly sent by strongman in Chechnya Ramzan Kadyrov.

Population
There are no reliable figures on ethnic minorities in Syria, however, estimates on the Chechen minority ranged from 6,000 to 35,000 in 2008.

The Chechen community in the Golan Heights were evicted following the 1967 Arab-Israeli War, with many Chechen refugees moving to Damascus whilst others emigrated abroad, especially to the United States.

Culture
Due to repression by the Syrian Ba'athist government, the Chechen minority have been little successful in preserving their language and culture. The Encyclopedia of Arabic Language and Linguistics places the Chechen language as the sixth-most spoken language in the country.

References

Ethnic groups in Syria
Syria